Alcyonidium is a genus of bryozoans in the order Ctenostomatida.

Species
The following species are included in the genus by the World Register of Marine Species:-

Alcyonidium adustum Winston & Hayward, 2012
Alcyonidium albescens Winston & Key, 1999
Alcyonidium albidum Alder, 1857
Alcyonidium androsovae d'Hondt, 1983
Alcyonidium anglei d'Hondt & Goyffon, 1991
Alcyonidium antarcticum Waters, 1904
Alcyonidium argyllaceum Castric-Fey, 1971
Alcyonidium australe d'Hondt & Moyano, 1979
Alcyonidium candidum Ryland, 1963
Alcyonidium capronae Winston & Hakansson, 1986
Alcyonidium cellarioides Calvet, 1900
Alcyonidium chondroides O'Donoghue & de Watteville, 1937
Alcyonidium columbianum O'Donoghue & O'Donoghue, 1926
Alcyonidium condylocinereum Porter, 2004
Alcyonidium diaphanum (Hudson, 1778)
Alcyonidium disciforme Smitt, 1872
Alcyonidium duplex Prouho, 1892
Alcyonidium effusum Norman, 1909
Alcyonidium eightsi Winston & Hayward, 1994
Alcyonidium enteromorpha Soule, 1951
Alcyonidium epispiculum Porter & Hayward, 2004
Alcyonidium erectum Silén, 1942
Alcyonidium excavatum Hincks, 1880
Alcyonidium exiguum Vieira, Migotto & Winston, 2014
Alcyonidium flabelliforme Kirkpatrick, 1902
Alcyonidium flustroides Busk, 1886
Alcyonidium foliaceum Silén, 1942
Alcyonidium gelatinosum (Linnaeus, 1761)
Alcyonidium hauffi Marcus, 1939
Alcyonidium hirsutum (Fleming, 1828)
Alcyonidium hydrocoalitum Porter, 2004
Alcyonidium irregulare Kluge, 1962
Alcyonidium kermadecense Gordon, 1984
Alcyonidium lutosum Winston & Hayward, 2012
Alcyonidium maculosum Winston & Hayward, 2012

Alcyonidium mamillatum Alder, 1857
Alcyonidium multigemmatum Gordon, 1986
Alcyonidium nanum Silén, 1942
Alcyonidium nipponicum d'Hondt & Mawatari, 1986
Alcyonidium nodosum O'Donoghue & de Watteville, 1944
Alcyonidium nostoch (A.P.de Candolle) Lamouroux, 1813
Alcyonidium pachydermatum Denisenko, 1996
Alcyonidium papillatum O'Donoghue, 1924
Alcyonidium parasiticum (Fleming, 1828)
Alcyonidium pedunculatum Robertson, 1902
Alcyonidium pelagosphaerum Porter & Hayward, 2004
Alcyonidium polyoum (Hassall, 1841)
Alcyonidium polypylum Marcus, 1941
Alcyonidium proboscideum Kluge, 1962
Alcyonidium protoseideum
Alcyonidium pseudodisciforme Denisenko, 2009
Alcyonidium pulvinatum Vieira, Migotto & Winston, 2014
Alcyonidium radicellatum Kluge, 1946
Alcyonidium rhomboidale O'Donoghue, 1924
Alcyonidium rylandi d'Hondt & Goyffon, 2005
Alcyonidium sagamianum Mawatari, 1953
Alcyonidium sanguineum Cook, 1985
Alcyonidium scolecoideum Porter & Hayward, 2004
Alcyonidium shizuoi d'Hondt & Mawatari, 1986
Alcyonidium simulatum Porter & Hayward, 2004
Alcyonidium torpedo d'Hondt, 2006
Alcyonidium torquatum Vieira, Migotto & Winston, 2014
Alcyonidium variegatum Prouho, 1892
Alcyonidium vermiculare Okada, 1925
Alcyonidium verrilli Osburn, 1912
Alcyonidium vicarians d'Hondt & Chimenz Gusso, 2006
Alcyonidium vitreum Vieira, Migotto & Winston, 2014

References

Bryozoan genera
Ctenostomatida